The 2020 Next Generation ATP Finals would have been a men's exhibition tennis tournament that was scheduled to be held in Milan, Italy, from 10 to 14 November 2020. It would have been the 4th edition of the event. However, the tournament was cancelled by the Association of Tennis Professionals (ATP) due to the COVID-19 pandemic, on 14 August 2020.

Qualification

The top seven players in the ATP Race to Milan would have qualified, with the eighth spot reserved for an Italian wild card, as in the past three editions. Eligible players had to be 21 or under at the start of the year (born in 1999 or later for the 2020 edition).

On 16 March 2020, the ATP rankings were frozen due to the COVID-19 pandemic. As a result of the pandemic, the ATP changed its ranking system for 2020. The ATP rankings would have been used to determine qualification.

Players in gold would have qualified for the Next Gen ATP Finals.

See also
2020 ATP Tour

References

External links

2020
2020 ATP Tour
2020 tennis exhibitions
ATP